Count Wilhelm Reinhard von Neipperg (27 May 1684  – 26 May 1774) was an Austrian general.

Biography
Born in Schwaigern, the residence of the Lordship, from 1766 County of Neipperg, he descended from an ancient comital family from Swabia, his father Count Eberhard Friedrich von Neipperg (1655–1725) having been an Imperial field marshal. He spent his boyhood in Vienna and in 1702 joined the Imperial service. He was a Obristlieutnant in his father's regiment in 1709, and by 1715 was a colonel. He distinguished himself at Temesvar in 1716 and at Belgrade in 1717.

After fighting against the Turks, he renounced his  military career in order to attend to the  education of Prince Francis of Lorraine, the future Holy Roman Emperor.  He was elevated to the rank of count in 1726. Neipperg was with Fieldmarshal Wallis at the Battle of Grocka and negotiated the Peace of Belgrade (1739). Two years later, during the War of Austrian Succession, he commanded the Austrian Army which was defeated at the Battle of Mollwitz by Frederick II of Prussia. Nonetheless he became an Imperial field marshal later that year.

His daughter, Maria Wilhelmina von Neipperg, became  mistress of Francis I, Holy Roman Emperor. His grandson Adam Albert von Neipperg married Napoleon's widow Marie Louise. 

He died at Vienna in 1774, just one day before his 90th birthday.

Notes

References
 Ingrao, Charles W., The Habsburg Monarchy, 1618-1815, Cambridge University Press, 1994.
 Jones, Archer, The art of war in the Western world, University of Illinois Press, 1987.
 Wheatcroft, Andrew, The Enemy at the Gate: Habsburgs, Ottomans, and the Battle for Europe, Bodley Head Random House, 2008.

External link

1684 births
1774 deaths
People from Heilbronn (district)
Field marshals of Austria
Austrian military personnel of the War of the Austrian Succession
People of the Silesian Wars